Bastilla praetermissa is a moth of the family Erebidae first described by William Warren in 1913. It is found in India and China.

The larvae feed on Phyllanthus species.

References

External links
Hong Kong Fauna - via Internet Archive.

Bastilla (moth)
Moths of Asia
Moths described in 1913